Shwegu Township is a township of Bhamo District in the Kachin State of Burma. The principal town is Shwegu.

Towns and villages

Amatgyigon
Aung Yang
Bogon
Bumsi
Buwa
Chinlon
Heinun
Hgnettada
Hkachang
Hkachoyang
Hkahkyeng
Hkahpauk
Hkapra
Hnokkyo
Hpalapyang
Hpawlam Jinghkyen
Htingrahtap
Kaitu
Kani
Kanlaung
Kathankawng
Khachyang
Khamawkawng
Konnu
Kyaukkyi
Kyauktalon
Kyundaw
Lagatyan
Lahkun
Lakum
Lana
Leiksin
Linghkyi
Loipaw
Loiyang
Lunghpa
Maichyen
Maihtingyang
Man Aw
Mankaw
Man Kin
Man Pu
Man Wein
Maru
Mawgyan
Mayingin
Mege
Mokin
Mole
Mosit
Myaingtha
Myaing Ywa
Myogon
Myohla
Namlenkawng
Namolai
Nampu
Nam-un
Nankok
Nantan
Nataungyan
Naungletgyi
Naungmo
Naungyin
Ngabatgyi
Nkrutkru
Nyaunggon
Panbonkawnan
Panbonyang
Pandin
Pankhongyang
Paukkon
Pinmahkaw
Shawbyu
Shu-u-kawng
Shwegu
Shwegugale
Simaw
Simugale
Sindat
Sindatka
Si-ngan
Sinkan
Sinpokgale
Sinwekawng
Sithaung
Sonpu
Tali
Tashi Loipaw
Taukte
Taungdu
Tawbakawng
Tawbon
Tawian
Thinbawin
Tonpon
Tugyaung
Umung-gahtawng
Wapyat
Wetawngkawng
Winwa
Woretu
Yele
Zagatdaung
Zayatgyi
Zayitin
Zinbon

References

 
Townships of Kachin State